High Priestess is the third studio album from heavy metal ensemble Kobra and the Lotus.  Produced by Grammy Award nominee and songwriter Johnny K, the album was released on June 24, 2014.

Background 
The ensemble created fourteen new songs for the album at Groovemaster Recording Studios.  The album made its debut in the CMJ Loud Rock Radio charts in the United States at #4.

Composition 
A lyric video was created for "I Am, I Am".  The eighth video by the band, entitled "Soldier" was shot in a vacated mine in British Columbia with director Lisa Mann.  The production features genuine World War II arms and clothing.

Critical reception 
The album received praise from Get Your Rock Out writer Michael Dodd who particularly singled out the song 'Willow', calling it "a grippingly addictive highlight". Summing up the record he wrote that "With High Priestess the group can boast a true treasure, an album that is just too fun to not listen to again and again; a real force of awesome metal and one of the most addictive releases of 2014".

Track listing 

Mastered by Ted Jensen at Sterling Sound, NYC

Credit

Personnel
Kobra Paige - lead vocals
Griffin Kissack - drums
Jasio Kulakowski - lead/rhythm guitars
Brad Kennedy - bass

Additional personnel
Charlie Reigo - additional guitars on tracks 2 and 7
Elias Bones - additional drums
Jake Dreyer - additional guitars
Matt Dougherty - engineering

References 

2014 albums
Kobra and the Lotus albums